Bijrol is a village in the Baghpat District of Uttar Pradesh, India. Having a population of more than eleven thousand this village is 6 km from Baraut the sub district of Baghpat. Visitors here visit to see the Ashoka Pillar

Geography
It has an average elevation of 230 metres (754 ft).

Notables
Sah Mal, a fighter against the British during the 1857 war
Gourav Sharma, Dy. Commandant in BSF

References
http://www.jagran.com/uttar-pradesh/bagpat-9476767.html

External links
 http://www.facebook.com/pages/Bijrol/111638822221262
 http://www.indiamapia.com/Bagpat/bijrol.html

Villages in Bagpat district